GDNF family receptor alpha-4 (GFRα4), also known as the persephin receptor, is a protein that in humans is encoded by the GFRA4 gene.

See also
 GFRα

References